Thermosbaenacea is a group of crustaceans that live in thermal springs in fresh water, brackish water and anchialine habitats. They have occasionally been treated as a distinct superorder (Pancarida), but are generally considered to belong to the Peracarida. Due to their troglobitic lifestyle, thermosbaenaceans lack visual pigments and are therefore blind.

The current distribution of some genera tallies well with the Miocene extent of the Tethys Sea, and it is assumed that the extant taxa are derived from ancestors that lived in open marine habitats. Elsewhere, the distribution is consistent with the break-up of Pangaea.

The developing embryos are carried by the adult under its carapace until hatching.

Classification
Thirty-four species are currently recognised, in four families:
Thermosbaenidae Monod, 1927
Thermosbaena mirabilis Monod, 1924 Tunisia
Monodellidae Taramelli, 1924
Monodella stygicola Ruffo, 1949 southern Italy
Tethysbaena aiakos Wagner, 1994 Greece
Tethysbaena argentarii (Stella, 1951) Italy
Tethysbaena atlantomaroccana (Boutin & Cals, 1985) Morocco
Tethysbaena calsi Wagner, 1994 British Virgin Islands
Tethysbaena colubrae Wagner, 1994 Puerto Rico
Tethysbaena coqui Wagner, 1994 Puerto Rico
Tethysbaena gaweini Wagner, 1994 Cuba
Tethysbaena haitiensis Wagner, 1994 Cuba
Tethysbaena halophila (S.L. Karaman, 1953) Croatia
Tethysbaena juglandis Wagner, 1994 Haiti
Tethysbaena juriaani Wagner, 1994 Cuba
Tethysbaena lazarei Wagner, 1994 Cuba
Tethysbaena relicta (Por, 1962) Israel
Tethysbaena sanctaecrucis (Stock, 1976) British Virgin Islands
Tethysbaena scabra (Pretus, 1991) Spain (Balearic Islands)
Tethysbaena scitula Wagner, 1994 British Virgin Islands
Tethysbaena siracusae Wagner, 1994 Italy (Sicily)
Tethysbaena stocki Wagner, 1994 British Virgin Islands
Tethysbaena somala (Chelazzi & Messana, 1982) Somalia
Tethysbaena tarsiensis Wagner, 1994 Spain
Tethysbaena texana (Maguire, 1965) United States (Texas)
Tethysbaena tinima Wagner, 1994 Cuba
Tethysbaena vinabayesi Wagner, 1994 Cuba
Tulumellidae Wagner, 1994
Tulumella bahamensis Yager, 1988 Bahamas
Tulumella grandis Yager, 1988 Bahamas
Tulumella unidens Bowman & Iliffe, 1988 Mexico
Halosbaenidae Monod & Cals, 1988
Limnosbaena finki Mestrov & Lattinger-Penko, 1969 Bosnia and Herzegovina and northern Italy
Halosbaena acanthura Stock, 1976 Venezuela, Netherlands Antilles (Curaçao)
Halosbaena fortunata Bowman & Iliffe, 1986 Spain (Canary Islands)
Halosbaena tulki Poore & Humphreys, 1992 Australia (Western Australia)
Theosbaena cambodjiana Cals & Boutin, 1985 Cambodia

References

External links

Malacostraca
Crustacean orders